Seung-hwan is a Korean masculine given name. Its meaning differs based on the hanja used to write each syllable of the name. There are 15 hanja with the reading "seung" and 21 hanja with the reading "hwan" on the South Korean government's official list of hanja which may be registered for use in given names.

People with this name include:

Entertainers
Lee Seung-hwan (born 1965), South Korean singer and songwriter
Shin Seung-hwan (born 1978), South Korean actor
Jung Seung-hwan (singer) (born 1996), South Korean singer
Baek Seung-hwan (born 1998), South Korean actor

Sportspeople
Ji Seung-hwan (cyclist) (born 1971), South Korean cyclist 
Ji Seung-hwan (born 1974), South Korean field hockey player 
Oh Seung-hwan  (born 1982), South Korean relief pitcher
Bang Seung-hwan (born 1983), South Korean football player 
Jung Seung-hwan (sledge hockey) (born 1988), South Korean sledge hockey player

See also
List of Korean given names

References

Korean masculine given names